Xrobb L-Għagin is an area in southeastern Malta. It is mostly known due to the nature park located inside it's boundaries which goes by the same name. It is also home to Xrobb l-Għaġin Tower, which is a ruined De Redin watchtower. The peninsula was also home to a Deutsche Welle relay station which later became the nature park main building.

Xrobb l-Għaġin Temple 

The temple of Xrobb l-Għaġin is also located in Xrobb l-Għaġin, it being the ruins of a Megalithic temple with its earliest remains dating to 4000BC. As these remains are located on the rapidly deteriorating cliff-side, efforts are currently being made to restore and protect them from future erosion. Solutions including the removal of certain structures to make them accessible somewhere else have been explored. The temple complex was first identified in 1913 by Temi Zammit and Thomas Ashby, then being excavated between 1914 and 1915. Investigations which occurred exactly one hundred years later, in 2015 have showed that there are still significant remains of the temple. The structure followed the typical plan of other Maltese Temples containing a paved court with an inner passage leading to four apices. The temple is oriented towards the southeast.

Xrobb L-Għaġin as a Nature Park 
The project's goal is to increase the use of renewable energy, manage wastewater, and protect biodiversity via teaching, demonstration, and research in sustainable environment solutions. A wildlife rehabilitation center was planned to be set up in the park. The park's main building complex also houses a hostel with around 30 beds. As part of its environmental protection policies, Xrobb l-Għaġin was home to an oil spill response training organized by Birdlife Malta.

References 

Parks in Malta
Marsaxlokk
Deutsche Welle
Peninsulas of Malta
Extreme points of Malta